Westley may refer to:

People
 Westley Allan Dodd (1961–1993), American serial killer 
 Westley Sissel Unseld (1946–2020), American professional basketball player, coach and executive
 William Westley Guth (1871–1929), American attorney, Methodist minister, and academic
 William Westley Richards (1789–1865), British firearms manufacturer
 David Westley (born 1974), former professional rugby league footballer
 Tom Westley (born 1989), English professional cricketer

Places
 Westley Waterless, a small village and civil parish in East Cambridgeshire, England
 Westley, California, a census-designated place in Stanislaus County, California
 Westley, Suffolk, a village and civil parish in the St Edmundsbury district of Suffolk in eastern England

Fictional characters
 Westley, a character from the 1973 fantasy romance novel The Princess Bride by William Goldman and the 1987 film adaptation

See also
Wesley (disambiguation)
Wes (disambiguation)